A graffito (plural "graffiti"), in an archaeological context, is a deliberate mark made by scratching or engraving on a large surface such as a wall. The marks may form an image or writing.  The term is not usually used for the engraved decoration on small objects such as bones, which make up a large part of the Art of the Upper Paleolithic, but might be used for the engraved images, usually of animals, that are commonly found in caves, though much less well known than the cave paintings of the same period; often the two are found in the same caves.  In archaeology, the term may or may not include the more common modern sense of an "unauthorized" addition to a building or monument. Sgraffito, a decorative technique of partially scratching off a top layer of plaster or some other material to reveal a differently colored material beneath, is also sometimes known as "graffito".

Listings of graffiti
Basic categories of graffiti in archaeology are:

Written graffiti, or informal inscriptions.
Images in graffiti.
Complex, merged, or multiple category graffiti.

Ancient Egypt graffiti 
Modern knowledge of the history of Ancient Egypt was originally derived from inscriptions, literature, (Books of the Dead), pharaonic historical records, and reliefs, from temple statements, and numerous individual objects whether pharaonic or for the Egyptian citizenry. Twentieth-century developments led to finding less common sources of information indicating the intricacies of the interrelationships of the pharaoh, his appointees, and the citizenry.

Three minor sources have helped link the major pieces of interrelationships in Ancient Egypt: ostraca, scarab artifacts, and numerous temple, quarry, etc. sources have helped fill in minor pieces of the complex dealings in Ancient Egypt. The reliefs, and writings with the reliefs, are often supplemented with a graffito, often in hieratic and discovered in locations not commonly seen, like a doorjamb, hallway, entranceway, or the side or reverse of an object.

Late (Roman) Demotic graffiti

Very Late Egyptian Demotic was used only for ostraca, mummy labels, subscriptions to Greek texts, and graffiti.  The last dated example of Egyptian Demotic is from the Temple of Isis at Philae, dated to 11 December 452 CE. See Demotic "Egyptian".

Roman graffiti

The original "Rotas Square" was later made into the 'Sator Square'.

Sator square

The Sator square is a Latin graffito found at numerous sites throughout the Roman Empire (e.g. Pompeii, Dura-Europos), and elsewhere (United Kingdom).

Deir el-Bahri religious graffiti
Pilgrims to religious sites left numerous graffiti at the Egyptian site of Deir el-Bahri.

Graffiti in ancient Athens
Large quantities of graffiti have been found in Athens during excavations by the American School of Classical Studies at Athens; nearly 850 were catalogued by Mabel Lang in 1976. These include a variety of different types of graffiti, such as abecedaria, kalos inscriptions, insults, marks of ownership, commercial notations, dedications, Christian inscriptions, messages, lists and pictures. They date from the eighth century BC through to the late Roman period.

Medieval graffiti in Britain 
There are several types of graffiti found in British buildings dating from the Middle Ages. There is a wide range of graffiti to be found on medieval buildings and especially in churches. These are some of the most common types:

Architectural Drawings
Compass Drawings
Crosses
Early text
Figures
Heraldry
Mason's Marks
Merchant's Marks
Pentangles
Ship Graffiti
Solomon's knot
VV Symbols

Medieval graffiti is a relatively new area of study with the first full-length work being produced in 1967 by Violet Pritchard. The Norfolk Medieval Graffiti Survey was established in 2010 with the aim of undertaking the first large-scale survey of medieval graffiti in the UK. The survey primarily looks at graffiti dating from the fourteenth to seventeenth centuries. Since 2010 a number of other county based surveys have been set up. These include Kent, Suffolk and Surrey.

The examples below are from Saint Nicholas, the parish church of Blakeney.

See also
Ancient Maya graffiti
Graffiti
Ostracon
Scarab artifact

References

Further reading

Ceram, C. W.  The March of Archaeology, C.W. Ceram, translated from the German, Richard and Clara Winston, (Alfred A. Knopf, New York), .
Champion, Matthew, Medieval Graffiti: The Lost Voices of England's Churches, 2015
Pritchard, V. English Medieval Graffiti, 1967

External links

Sator Square, inscribed, Article; the article uses: "Rotas square"

 
Inscriptions
Graffiti and unauthorised signage